Zoran is a common South Slavic name, the masculine form of Zora, which means dawn, daybreak. The name is especially common in Serbia, North Macedonia, Croatia and a little in Slovenia.

Notable people with this given name include:

Zoran Bečić, Bosnian Serb actor
Zoran Baldovaliev, Macedonian football player
Zoran Cvijanović, Serbian actor
Zoran Ćirić, Serbian writer
Zoran Đerić, Bosnian Serb politician
Zoran Đinđić, Serbian politician
Zoran Dukić, Croatian classical guitarist
Zoran Džorlev, Macedonian violinist
Zoran Erić, Serbian composer
Zoran Erceg, Serbian basketball player
Zoran Filipović, Montenegrin football coach
Zoran G. Jančić, Bosnian Croat pianist
Zoran Janjetov, Serbian comic artist

Zoran Jovanovski, Macedonian football player
Zoran Jolevski, Macedonian Ambassador to the US
Zoran Knežević (astronomer), Serbian astronomer 
Zoran Knežević (politician), Serbian politician
Zoran Krušvar, Croatian writer
Zoran Ladicorbic, Yugoslavian-born American fashion designer, professionally known as Zoran.
Zoran Lilić, Serbian politician
Zoran Lončar, Serbian politician
Zoran Mamić, Croatian football player 
 Zoran Milanović, Croatian politician 
Zoran Milinković (politician), Serbian politician
Zoran Mirković, Serbian football player 
Zoran Mušič, Slovenian painter
Zoran Pavlovič, Slovenian football player
Zoran Planinić, Croatian basketball player
Zoran Pešić (rugby league), Serbian rugby player
Zoran Predin, Slovenian musician
Zoran Radmilović, Serbian actor
Zoran Radović, Serbian basketball player 
Zoran Rankić, Serbian actor
Zoran Rant, Slovenian scientist
Zoran Redžić, Bosnian musician
Zoran Savić, Serbian basketball player 
Zoran Simjanović, Serbian musician
Zoran Simović, Montenegrin football player
Zoran Stanković, Serbian politician
Zoran Stojković, Serbian politician
Zorán Sztevanovity (Zoran Stefanović), Serbian-Hungarian musician 
Zoran Šami, Serbian Politician
Zoran Terzić, Serbian volleyball player and coach
Zoran Tošić, Serbian footballer 
Zoran Urumov, Serbian footballer
Zoran Vanev, Macedonian musician
Zoran Vujović, Croatian football player
Zoran Vuković, Bosnian Serb war crime suspect
 
Zoran Vulić, Croatian football player 
Zoran Zaev, Macedonian politician
Zoran Žigić, Bosnian Serb war crime suspect

See also
Slavic names

References

Masculine given names
Slavic masculine given names
Bosnian masculine given names
Bulgarian masculine given names
Croatian masculine given names
Macedonian masculine given names
Serbian masculine given names